Odiyal is a hard, edible snack made from palmyra palm tubers (Palmyra sprouts). Generally, it is split into two and dried until it gets hard. Odiyal can be prepared in another form called Pulukodiyal (புழுக்கொடியல்). Pulukodiyal is prepared by boiling and then drying. It is used to produce Pulukodiyal flour.

Odiyal is a main ingredient for some food products such as Odiyal flour, Odiyal chips, Odiyal pittu, Odiyal kool, Palm posha, etc. It is a popular snack in the Jaffna peninsula.

Research 
A study says that odiyal has carbohydrate, fibre, calcium, magnesium, iron, fat and protein in various levels. It has likely toxicity and it can be reduced by heating to 80 °C for 15 – 20 minutes.

References

External links 
 The Palmyra or Toddy Palm (Borassus flabellifer L.)
 Some studies on the neurotoxic effect of palmyrah odiyal flour

Borassus
Edible palms
Indian cuisine
Sri Lankan snack food